is a Japanese surname. People with this surname include:
, Japanese woodblock print artist
, Japanese actress 
, pseudonym of a Japanese erotica artist

Fictional characters with this surname include:
, character in 2017 video game Danganronpa V3
Sora Harukawa (春川宙), character in Ensemble Stars!

Japanese-language surnames